Raná is a municipality and village in Louny District in the Ústí nad Labem Region of the Czech Republic. It has about 200 inhabitants.

Administrative parts
The village of Hrádek is an administrative part of Raná.

References

Villages in Louny District